Nairobi Terminus is a railway station on the Mombasa–Nairobi Standard Gauge Railway (SGR) located in Syokimau, just south of Nairobi, the capital of Kenya. Two passenger trains leave the station everyday, an inter-county train that stops at all stations and an express train that goes directly to Mombasa Terminus.

The Nairobi Terminus station was built next to the existing Syokimau station, which allows passengers to transfer from standard gauge trains to metre gauge trains to get to the Nairobi city centre.

Gallery

References

Railway stations in Kenya
Railway stations opened in 2017
Buildings and structures in Nairobi
Transport in Nairobi